Junior men's artistic individual all-around competition at the 2010 Summer Youth Olympics was held at the Bishan Sports Hall on August 18.

For each competitor in the men's qualification, the scores for all six apparatus were summed to give an all-around qualification score. The top 18 competitors moved on to the individual all-around final. In the individual all-around final, each gymnast competed on each apparatus again. Only scores from the final were used to determine final rankings.

Medalists

Qualification

Final round results

Reserves
The reserves for the All Around Final were:
 (19th place)
 (20th place)
 (21st place)
 (22nd place)

References

Gymnastics at the 2010 Summer Youth Olympics